The Complete Stone Roses is a compilation of singles and B-sides by English rock band The Stone Roses. It was released in 1995 without the band's input by their record company Silvertone, with whom they were embroiled in a protracted legal battle to terminate their five-year contract.

The album features an almost complete collection of the band's singles and B-sides for the label, as well as earlier releases for other labels.

Track listing

Catalogue Numbers
2LP: Silvertone ORE LP 535
Cassette: Silvertone ORE C 535
CD: Silvertone ORE CD 535

Bonus CD tracks
The first 60,000 copies of the CD came with a bonus disc featuring:

Catalogue Number
2CD: Silvertone ORE Z CD 535

Personnel
The Stone Roses
Ian Brown – vocals
John Squire – guitar
Andy Couzens – guitar (tracks 1, 2)
Pete Garner – bass (tracks 1 - 5)
Mani – bass (tracks 6 - 21)
Reni – drums, backing vocals

Production
Martin Hannett - producer (1, 2)
Chris Nagle, John Hurst - engineering (1, 2)
The Stone Roses - producer (3 - 5)
Peter Hook - producer (6 - 8)
John Leckie - producer (9, 11 - 21)
The Garage Flowers - producer (10, bonus disc)
Paul Schroeder - producer (10)
John Squire - painting
David Saunders - design
Paul Slattery - photography
John Harris - liner notes

References

The Stone Roses albums
1995 compilation albums
Albums produced by John Leckie
Albums produced by Martin Hannett